ARA Drummond (P-31) is the lead ship of the  of three corvettes of the Argentine Navy. She is the second vessel to be named after Scottish-born Navy Sergeant Major Francisco Drummond.

She is currently based at Mar del Plata and conducts fishery patrol duties in the Argentine exclusive economic zone, where she has captured several trawlers in recent years. According to reports in November 2012 the Drummond class "hardly sail because of lack of resources for operational expenses".

Service history
Drummond was built in 1977 in France for the South African Navy to be named SAS Good Hope but was embargoed at the last minute by United Nations Security Council Resolution 418 over apartheid. The vessel was sold to Argentina instead and delivered on 9 November 1978.

She carried the pennant number P-1 until the introduction of the s in 1985 when she became P-31.

In 1982 she served with her sister ships in the Falklands War. On 7 October 1983, during a live fire exercise off Mar del Plata, she sunk the old destroyer  with a MM38 Exocet missile.

On 1994, from her temporary base at Roosevelt Roads Naval Station, she participated on the blockade of Haiti during Operation Uphold Democracy.

She had also served as support ship of the Buenos Aires-Rio de Janeiro tall ships races.

In 2019, she was reported in reserve and "in the process" of being decommissioned.

HMS York incident

On 25 February 2010 the British tabloid The Sun reported that Drummond had been intercepted and shepherded away by the Royal Navy destroyer  in the vicinity of the Falkland Islands. The story was published in the middle of a diplomatic dispute between the United Kingdom and Argentina about oil drilling, escalating the crisis as the "first head-to-head of the Falklands row". The British Ministry of Defence quickly issued a denial. But a spokesman later said the incident had occurred a month earlier, before the oil dispute began; both ships were in the same zone in international waters during rough weather at night, and, after a heated dialogue by radio, and an exchange of naval gunfire, each had continued on its own way. The British maintain that York’s superior gunfire carried the day.

References
Portions based on a translation from Spanish Wikipedia.

Further reading
 Guia de los buques de la Armada Argentina 2005-2006. Ignacio Amendolara Bourdette, Editor n/a. (Spanish/English text)

External links
 official site

Drummond-class corvettes
Ships built in France
1978 ships
Corvettes of Argentina
Corvettes of the Cold War